The Sun Voyager is a sculpture by Jón Gunnar Árnason, located next to the Sæbraut road in Reykjavík, Iceland. Sun Voyager is described as a dreamboat, or an ode to the Sun. The artist intended it to convey the promise of undiscovered territory, a dream of hope, progress and freedom.

History
In 1986, the district association of the west part of the city funded a competition for a new outdoor sculpture to commemorate the 200th anniversary of the city of Reykjavík. Árnason's Sun Voyager won the competition, and the aluminium model was presented to the city for enlargement. The full-sized Sun Voyager was eventually unveiled on Sæbraut on the birthday of the city of Reykjavík, 18 August 1990.

The work is constructed of stainless steel and stands on a circle of granite slabs surrounded by so-called "town-hall concrete". It was constructed in accordance with Árnason's enlarged full-scale drawing of Sun Voyager and was overseen by his assistant, the artist Kristin E. Hrafnsson. The engineering of the sculpture was supervised by the technologist Sigurjón Yngvason, in close cooperation with Árnason himself, the construction was carried out by Reynir Hjálmtýsson and his assistant.

Concept 
In an interview published in the newspaper Þjóðviljinn on 11 June 1987, Árnason described the genesis of the work as being part of the Scandinavian art project Experimental Environment, which conducted various artistic experiments in Iceland, Denmark and other places in the 1980s:

Location
There has been some dispute about the eventual location of Sun Voyager on Sæbraut in Reykjavík. Some people have complained that the ship does not face west, towards the setting Sun in accordance with the concept behind it. The original intention had been for Sun Voyager to be situated in the west part of Reykjavík, for obvious reasons. Árnason's original idea had been for the ship to be placed on Landakot hill, the prow facing the centre of Reykjavík and the stern to Christ the King Cathedral. Another possibility was that it could be placed by the harbour in the centre of Reykjavík on a specially constructed base. 

The coastline by Ánanaust nonetheless eventually came to be Árnason's preferred location for the ship. Unfortunately, changes in the town planning for Reykjavík came to rule out this location. In the end, the final decision was taken (with Árnason's consent) that Sun Voyager should be located on Sæbraut on a small headland (which the artist jokingly called Jónsnes: Jón's Peninsula). Árnason was well aware that when bolted to its platform, Sun Voyager would be facing north, but felt that that made little difference when it came down to it.

Sun Voyager was built in accordance with the artist's hand-drawn full-scale plan. Its irregular form with the ever-flowing lines and poetic movement which are a distinctive feature of so many of his works make it seem as if the ship is floating on air. It reaches out into space in such a way that the sea, the sky and the mind of the observer become part of the work as a whole. As a result, Sun Voyager has the unique quality of being able to carry each and every observer to wherever his/her mind takes him/her. Few of Árnason's works have a simple, obvious interpretation. As he stated himself, all works of art should convey a message that transcends the work itself. It is the observer who bears the eventual responsibility for interpreting the works in his/her own way, thus becoming a participant in the overall creation of the work. Árnason's works frequently make such demands on the observers, giving them the opportunity to discover new truths as a result of their experience.

See also

 Icelandic art

External links
 Photo gallery of the Sun Voyager - PhotoHound

Bibliography 

Jón Gunnar Árnason, Hugarorka og sólstafir. National Gallery of Iceland, 1994.
SÚM 1965-1972.  Reykjavik Art Museum, 1989.
Íslensk list: 16 íslenskir myndlistarmenn. Hildur, 1981.
Íslensk listasaga, frá síðari hluta 19. aldar til upphafs 21. aldar. National Gallery of Iceland and Forlagið, 2011.

References

Culture in Reykjavík
Icelandic art
1990 sculptures
Steel sculptures in Iceland
Buildings and structures in Reykjavík
Tourist attractions in Reykjavík
Stainless steel sculptures